A greenway is usually a shared-use path along a strip of undeveloped land, in an urban or rural area, set aside for recreational use or environmental protection. Greenways are frequently created out of disused railways, canal towpaths, utility or similar rights of way, or derelict industrial land. Greenways also can also be linear parks, and can serve as wildlife corridors. The path's surface may be paved and often serves multiple users: walkers, runners, bicyclists, skaters and hikers. A characteristic of greenways, as defined by the European Greenways Association, is "ease of passage": that is that they have "either low or zero gradient", so that they can be used by all "types of users, including mobility impaired people". 

In Southern England, the term also refers to ancient trackways or green lanes, especially those found on chalk downlands, like the Ridgeway.

Definition 

Greenways are vegetated, linear, and multi-purpose. They incorporate a footpath and/or bikeway within a linear park. In urban design, they are a component of planning for bicycle commuting and walkability. The British organization Sustrans, who are involved in creating cycleways and greenways, states that a traffic free route "must be designed on the assumption that everyone will use it", and measures taken "to assist visually and mobility impaired users".

The American author Charles Little in his 1990 book, Greenways for America, defines a greenway as: 

A linear open space established along either a natural corridor, such as a riverfront, stream valley or ridgeline, or overland along a railroad right-of-way converted to recreational use, a canal, scenic road or other route. It is a natural or landscaped course for pedestrian or bicycle passage; an open-space connector linking parks, nature reserves, cultural features, or historic sites with each other and with populated areas; locally certain strip or linear parks designated as parkway or greenbelt. 

The term greenway comes from the green in green belt and the way in parkway, implying a recreational or pedestrian use rather than a typical street corridor, as well as an emphasis on introducing or maintaining vegetation, in a location where such vegetation is otherwise lacking. Some greenways include community gardens as well as typical park-style landscaping of trees and shrubs. They also tend to have a mostly contiguous pathway. Greenways resemble linear parks, but the latter are only found in urban and suburban environments.

The European Greenways Association defines it as 
Communication routes reserved exclusively for non-motorized journeys, developed in an integrated manner which enhances both the environment and quality of life of the surrounding area. These routes should meet satisfactory standards of width, gradient and surface condition to ensure that they are both user-friendly and low-risk for users of all abilities. (Lille Declaration, European Greenways Association, 12 September 2000).

Though wildlife corridors are also greenways, because they have conservation as their primary purpose, they are not necessarily managed as parks for recreational use, and may not include facilities such as public trails.

Characteristics 

Charles Little in his 1990 book, Greenways for America", describes five general types of greenways:
  Urban riverside (or other water body) greenways, usually created as part of (or instead of) a redevelopment program along neglected, often run-down, city waterfronts.
  Recreational greenways, featuring paths and trails of various kinds, often relatively long distance, based on natural corridors as well as canals, abandoned rail beds, and public rights-of-way.
  Ecologically significant natural corridors, usually along rivers and streams and less often ridgelines, to provide for wildlife migration and species interchange, nature study and hiking.
  Scenic and Historic routes, usually along a road, highway or waterway, the most representative of them making an effort to provide pedestrian access along the route or at least places to alight from the car.
  Comprehensive greenway systems or networks, usually based on natural landforms such as valleys or ridges but sometimes simply an opportunistic assemblage of greenways and open spaces of various kinds to create an alternative municipal or regional green infrastructure.

Greenways are found in rural areas as well as urban. Corridors redeveloped as greenways often travel through both city and country, connecting them together. Even in rural areas, greenways provide residents access to open land managed as parks, as contrasted with land that is vegetated but inappropriate for public use, such as agricultural land. Where the historic rural road network has been enlarged and redesigned to favor high-speed automobile travel, greenways provide an alternative for people who are elderly, young, less mobile or seeking a reflective pace.Loh et al.

Tom Turner analyzed greenways in London looking for common patterns among successful examples. He was inspired by the pattern language technique of architect Christopher Alexander. A pattern language is an organized and coherent set of "patterns", each of which describes a problem and the core of a solution that can be used in many ways within a specific field of expertise. Turner concluded there are seven types, or 'patterns', of greenway which he named: 
parkway: a landscaped thoroughfare. The term is particularly used for a roadway in a park or connecting to a park from which trucks and other heavy vehicles are excluded.
blueway: a water trail
paveway: an upgraded pavement or sidewalk: "Well-designed paveways, with appropriate planting and street furniture, should be formed along main pedestrian desire lines". 
glazeway: a glazed passage linking buildings. Turner argues for their greater use in cities. 
skyway, skybridge, or skywalk is an elevated type of pedway connecting two or more buildings in an urban area, or connecting elevated points within mountainous recreational zones. 
ecoway: linked green spaces or green corridor, including household gardens in a city.
cycleway.

Foreshoreway

In Australia, a foreshoreway (or oceanway) is a greenway that provides a public right-of-way along the edge of the sea, open to both walkers and cyclists. Foreshoreways resemble promenades and boardwalks.

Foreshoreways are usually concerned with the idea of sustainable transport. A foreshoreway is accessible to both pedestrians and cyclists and gives them the opportunity to move unimpeded along the seashore. Dead end paths that offer public access only to the ocean are not part of a foreshoreway.

A foreshoreway corridor often includes a number of traffic routes that provide access along an oceanfront, including:
 walking along the beach
 edge of foreshore off-road greenway
 edge of road off-road greenway
 on road bikeway
 on road private vehicles routes
 on road public transport corridor

A major example is The Gold Coast Oceanway along beaches in Gold Coast, Queensland, a shared use pedestrian and cyclist pathway on the Gold Coast, connecting the Point Danger lighthouse on the New South Wales and Queensland border to the Gold Coast Seaway. The network includes  of poor, medium and high quality pathways. Others include: The Chicago Lakefront Trail, the Dubai Marina, the East River Greenway, New Plymouth Coastal Walkway, and the Manhattan Waterfront Greenway.

Public rights of way frequently exist on the foreshore of beaches throughout the world. In legal discussions the foreshore is often referred to as the wet-sand area (see Right of way for a fuller discussion).

 Linear park 
A linear park is a park in an urban or suburban setting that is substantially longer than it is wide. Some are rail trails ("rails to trails"), that are disused railroad beds converted to recreational use, while others use strips of public land next to canals, streams, extended defensive walls, electrical lines, highways and shorelines. They are also often described as greenways.City of Kelowna, British Columbia, Canada In Australia, a linear park along the coast is known as a foreshoreway.

 Examples 

Asia
Guangdong Greenway, Guangdong province, China including much of Guangzhou city including the Guangzhou Higher Education Mega Center in Panyu District provides foot and bicycle paths along the Pearl River and other scenic areas.

Australia
Gold Coast Oceanway
Cooks River to Iron Cove Greenway

Canada
Carrall Street Greenway, currently under development in Vancouver
Central Valley Greenway, a 24-kilometre pedestrian and cyclist route through Metro Vancouver, running from Vancouver to New Westminster.
Chrysler Canada Greenway is a 42 km-long rail trail in Essex County, Ontario
Grand Concourse (St. John's), 200 kilometers (120 mi) of walkways linking every major park, river, pond, and green space in the Northeast Avalon region, of Newfoundland. 
Trans Canada Trail; Newfoundland T'Railway, Newfoundland
Vancouver Greenway Network, a list of Vancouver City Greenways
Welland Canal Parkway Trail, St Catharines and Port Colborne, Ontario

Europe
EuroVelo cycle routes and the European Greenways Association routes throughout Europe.
Vía Verde del Pas, between El Astillero and Puente Viesgo in Spain
RAVeL network is an autonomous network of slow ways in Belgium. It is a network of itineraries reserved for pedestrians, cyclists, horse riders and people with reduced mobility.
Waterford Greenway is a Rail trail in County Waterford, Ireland, used for cycling and hiking.

New Zealand
 Otago Central Rail Trail

United Kingdom
Ayot Greenway, Alban Way, and Cole Green Way Hertfordshire
The Greenway, foot and cycle path in East London, England
 The Ridgeway, foot and cycle path in South London, England
Parkland Walk, a reclaimed railway line in North London

United States
Anne Springs Close Greenway a 2,100 acre greenway and recreation complex in Fort Mill, South Carolina
Boise River Greenbelt, a  trail system in Boise, Idaho.
Brays Bayou, a bayou in Houston, Texas. 
Capital Area Greenbelt, a twenty-mile greenway connecting neighborhoods, parks and opens spaces in Harrisburg, Pennsylvania
Capital Area Greenway, one of the nation's oldest community greenway systems in Raleigh, North Carolina
Cardinal Greenway, Indiana's longest span of recreational trails.
Cherry Creek Greenway, Denver, Colorado
Chicago Lakefront Trail, an 18-mile (29 km) walking, cycling, and running trail along the coast of Lake Michigan in Chicago, Illinois.
Bloomingdale Trail,  a 2.7-mile (4.3 km) elevated linear park running east–west on the northwest side of Chicago Chicago, Illinois.
Dequindre Cut, a greenway connecting to the International Riverfront in Detroit, Michigan.
East Coast Greenway, a trail being constructed along the Atlantic coast of the United States
The Emerald Necklace, a series of interconnected parks in Boston, Massachusetts, designed by Frederick Law Olmsted
Grand Rounds Scenic Byway, a linked series of parks making a roughly circular path through Minneapolis, Minnesota  
Greater Grand Forks Greenway, large public park on the banks of the Red River and Red Lake River in Grand Forks, North Dakota, and East Grand Forks, Minnesota
High Line, New York City
Lafitte Greenway in New Orleans
Leon Creek Greenway, San Antonio, Texas linking The University of Texas at San Antonio by foot and bicycle path to Leon Valley and beyond.
Little Sugar Creek Greenway, 20-mile long greenway in Mecklenburg County, North Carolina
The Loop, a network of 7 linear parks encircling Tucson, Arizona, with over 100 miles of paved trails
Manhattan Waterfront Greenway, a circumferential foot and cycle path around Manhattan Island.
Maryville Alcoa Greenway, an eight mile long foot and cycle path extending from Maryville Intermediate School in Maryville, Tennessee, to the end of Springbrook Park in Alcoa, Tennessee
Midtown Greenway, five-and-a-half mile pedestrian and bicycle path through Minneapolis, Minnesota
MillionMile Greenway, an organization and a system of connected greenways across metro Atlanta, the state of Georgia and the eastern United States
Min Hi Line, linear park and trail that is repurposing a freight rail and agricultural-industrial corridor in Minneapolis, Minnesota, United States
Monadnock-Sunapee Greenway, 50-mile mountainous trail in southwestern New Hampshire (not a paved or shared-use path)
Mountains to Sound Greenway, 150 million acres of land surrounding Interstate 90 from Seattle across the Cascade Mountains to Ellensburg, Washington
Niagara River Greenway Plan, along the US Niagara Frontier
Ohio & Erie Canalway, follows the path of the original Ohio and Erie Canal in Northeast Ohio, United States.  A portion is maintained by the United States National Park Service as a part of Cuyahoga Valley National Park. 
Ohlone Greenway, in the East Bay region of the San Francisco Bay Area
Rahway River Parkway, along the Rahway River, Union County, New Jersey
Rachel Carson Greenway, in Maryland
The River Ring, a system of connected greenways encircling St. Louis, Missouri
Rose Kennedy Greenway, a series of parks and open spaces in Boston, Massachusetts

See also

Esplanade
Green Bridge
Landscape architecture
Landscape planning
Park system; Regional park; Urban park; Public park
Rails with trails
Trail
Walking in London

 Notes 

References

Sources
Fabos, Julius Gy. and Ahern, Jack (Eds.) (1995) Greenways: The Beginning of an International Movement, Elsevier Press
Flink, Charles A. & Searns, Robert M. (1993) Greenways A Guide to Planning, Design and Development Island Press
Flink, Charles A., Searns, Robert M. & Olka, Kristine (2001) Trails for the Twenty-First Century Island Press. Washington, DC. 
Hay, Keith G. (1994) "Greenways" The Conservation Fund. Arlington, VA.
Little, Charles E. Greenways for America (1990) Johns Hopkins University Press
Loh, Tracy Hadden et al. (2012) "Active Transportation Beyond Urban Centers: Walking and Bicycling in Small Towns and Rural America" Rails-to-Trails Conservancy. Washington, DC. (PDF retrieved 15 March 2012.)
Natural England Greenways Handbook (PDF retrieved 15 March 2012.)
Smith, Daniel S. & Hellmund, Paul Cawood. (1993) Ecology of Greenways: Design and Function of Linear Conservation Areas''. University of Minnesota Press

External links

Central and Eastern European Greenways 
European Greenways Association
Natural England, and their "Greenways and Quiet Lanes" project
New England Greenway
Guide to the International Greenways Resource Collection 1991-2011
Rail-to-Trails Conservancy, USA
Sustrans Greener Greenways 

 
Urban public parks
Regional parks
Parks
Landscape architecture
Land management
Urban studies and planning terminology
Sustainable urban planning
Types of thoroughfares
Cycling infrastructure
Trails